The Santa Monica Parish Church is one of the oldest churches in the province of Bulacan, Philippines, dating back to 1758. It displays Baroque architectural characteristics and features ceiling paintings which resemble those in the Sistine Chapel.

History
The town of Angat was formerly part of Quingwa, now Plaridel. Angat was oppressed by the town of San Miguel, followed by the town of Bocaue. When Angat became totally separate from Quingwa, it conquered the lands of Norzagaray and Doña Remedios Trinidad.

Founding of the parish

Angat became a parish in 1683, making it the sixth oldest parish in Bulacan. Augustinian priests were in charge of the management of the church. The first Augustinian priest who arrived at Angat was Juan Morelos in 1684.

The list below presents the succeeding Augustinian parish priests who served the Sta. Monica Parish Church.

Augustinian parish priests continued to serve Santa Monica Parish Church until 1898. From 1898 to the present, the parish church has been open for Diocesan priests. Mariano de los Reyes became the first Diocesan priest of the parish in 1898.

Architectural history

The following parish priests led the construction and redevelopment of the Santa Monica Parish Church.

Juan Morelos
 He was the first builder of the first church and the convent.

Gregorio Giner
 He built the new parish church with stronger materials in 1758. It was finished in 1773.

Joaquin Calvo
 He completed the facade in 1802 and was also responsible for the construction of the slender tower.

Ignacio Manzanares
 He restored the convent which was also damaged by the 1863 earthquake.

Architectural features

Santa Monica de Angat Parish Church was designed in Baroque architectural style. This could be verified with the existence of 18 adobe posts, along with eight windows. Windows, statued niches, and spaces between horizontal string courses, dividing the front facade into three parts, were ornamented with floral carvings. Also, foliated crestings on the raking course of the pediment were used as an added ornamentation.

Ceiling art paintings

The ceiling paintings within the interiors of the parish church resemble the ceiling paintings of the Sistine Chapel in the Vatican, Rome. History of Christianity in the Philippines and culture of Angat, Bulacan such as simbang gabi, Flores de Mayo, prusisyon ng Santissimo Sakramento, and fiesta were also incorporated within the ceiling paintings.

The ceiling paintings were started by G. Rene Robles in 1998 and finished by G. Jess Robles in 2002, in accordance with the order of Fr. Memeng.

Present condition

Several interventions were conducted under the administration of Angel Santiago, who was ordained as the parish priest of Santa Monica de Angat on November 15, 2013. They include:

 Addition of six wooden posts and carvings at the retablo
 Addition of floral designs and carving of Kordero at the front side and carvings of Santa Maria, San Jose, Santa Monica, and San Agustin at the sides of the Kordero
 Addition of carvings - carvings of chalice and host at the front side and carvings of San Markos, San Juan, San Mateo, and San Lukas at the sides of the altar
 Replacement of marble flooring of the sanctuary with black and white granite floor tiles
 Modification of staircase going up to the sanctuary

References

Roman Catholic churches in Bulacan
Baroque architecture in the Philippines
Churches in the Roman Catholic Diocese of Malolos